
Gmina Łambinowice is a rural gmina (administrative district) in Nysa County, Opole Voivodeship, in south-western Poland.

Villages
Gmina Łambinowice contains the villages and settlements of Bielice, Budzieszowice, Drogoszów, Jasienica Dolna, Łambinowice, Lasocice, Malerzowice Wielkie, Mańkowice, Piątkowice, Sowin, Szadurczyce and Wierzbie.

Neighbouring gminas
Gmina Łambinowice is bordered by the gminas of Korfantów, Niemodlin, Nysa, Pakosławice, Skoroszyce and Tułowice.

Twin towns – sister cities

Gmina Łambinowice is twinned with:
 Kamenná, Czech Republic

References

Lambinowice
Nysa County